

Railway modelling has long used a variety of scales and gauges to represent its models of real subjects. In most cases, gauge and scale are chosen together, so as to represent Stephenson standard gauge.  By choosing a smaller gauge than this for a particular scale, the model represents a narrow-gauge example.

Such gauge and scale combinations are of course used for the deliberate modelling of particular narrow-gauge subjects, where the choice of subject is behind the choice of combination. Narrow-gauge modelling has also become especially popular from the purely modelling aspects: it combines a conveniently visible large scale that is easier to work on, with a narrow model gauge that allows tighter radius curves and so fits layouts into smaller spaces. This has been a particular reason in Europe where, houses being generally smaller than in the US, there is rarely space for 0 gauge and even 00 gauge is restricted in the size of curves.

At times, particularly in the early days before the inertia of popular scales developed, modellers would choose seemingly random scales in order to model a particular prototype and its original gauge whilst using a readily available gauge. As the range of commercial products increases, both for gauges and scales, it is easier to find a combination that is already supported and so there is less need to scratch-build everything.

Naming 
Naming of these gauge and scale combinations follows a few broad rules, but not always consistently. Some, such as G gauge and SM32 were defined from the outset as narrow-gauge scales and so have a single component to their name.

British 
Many names, particularly those of British origin, such as O14 and 00-9 combine the name of the scale used with the physical measurement of the gauge, i.e. the 7mm to the foot scale from standard O gauge with a rail gauge of 14mm, giving a precise representation of  prototypes. As it is the scale that controls interoperability between models and also the manufacture of non-railway scenery etc., it is the scale rather than the gauge that takes the primary position in names.

European 
MOROP, the European model railway standards organisation, issues standards documents called NEMs . NEM010 defines the main model railway gauges, including narrow gauges. Unusually, unlike the British model railway trade, this recognised narrow-gauge modelling from the outset. This may be because of Europe's greater prototypical use of the larger narrow gauges for smaller branch lines.

NEM010 defines and names narrow gauges for all the supported scales although it takes a broad approach and groups the prototypes into 'nominal size' ranges or 'Nenngröße'. It defines these prototype gauge ranges as: 

Names are of the form 'H0e gauge', comparable to 00-9, as 'Narrow gauge in H0 scale'. Thus the scale and approximate prototype gauge are represented, with the model gauge used (9mm for H0e gauge;  6.5mm for H0f gauge) being implied.

The scales used include the general European modelling range of Z, N, TT, H0, 0 and also the large model engineering gauges of I to X, including 3", 5", 7" and 10" gauge. As 00 is a particularly British scale, it is not included within this pan European standard. However the predominantly US imperial-based S scale (1:64) does feature.

United States 
US gauges are named as On30 or Sn3, composed of the scale, 'n' for narrow gauge and the dimensions of the prototype gauge being modelled. These are universally in imperial units rather than metric, but there is no consistency between using inches or feet. Both On42 and On2 are used, but when referring to the prototype gauge, e.g. On30 / On2, the gauge is usually given in inches.

Gauge and scale combinations 

Standard gauge is shaded

Gauges

See also 
 Rail transport modelling scales
 List of rail transport modelling scale standards

Notes

References 

Scale model scales
Model railway scales, List of
Scales